Drozdov may refer to:

Drozdov (surname)
Drozdov (Beroun District), a municipality and village in the Czech Republic
Drozdov (Šumperk District), a municipality and village in the Czech Republic
18334 Drozdov, main-belt asteroid

See also
Drozdów (disambiguation)